Miss Basketball or Ms. Basketball is an award given to the best high school girls basketball player in many U.S. states.

American basketball trophies and awards
Women's basketball in the United States
American women's basketball players
Youth basketball